Emilio Romero is the name of

 Emilio Romero (writer) (Emilio Romero Gómez; 1917-2003), Spanish writer and journalist
 Emilio Romero (javelin thrower) (fl. 1950), Puerto Rican javelin thrower
 Emilio Romero (sprinter) (born 1937), Venezuelan sprinter
 Emilio Romero (soccer) (born 1954), American soccer player